DXRA-TV (channel 27) is a television station in Metro Davao, Philippines, serving as the Mindanao flagship of the GTV network. It is owned and operated by GMA Network, Inc. alongside GMA outlet DXMJ-TV (channel 5). Both stations share studios and transmitters at the GMA Complex, Broadcast Ave., Shrine Hills, Brgy. Matina Crossing, Davao City.

See also
GMA Network
GTV
GMA News TV (the former name of GTV)
DXGM-AM
DXRV
DXMJ-TV
List of GTV stations
Q
DWDB-TV
DYLS-TV

GTV (Philippine TV network) stations
Television stations in Davao City
Television channels and stations established in 1995